DT Virginis, also known as Ross 458, is a binary star system in the constellation of Virgo. It has an apparent visual magnitude of 9.79 and is located at a distance of 37.6 light-years from the Sun. Both of the stars are low-mass red dwarfs with at least one of them being a flare star. This binary system has a circumbinary sub-stellar companion.

This star was mentioned as a suspected variable by M. Petit in 1957. In 1960, O. J. Eggen classified it as a member of the Hyades moving group based on the system's space motion; it is now considered a likely member of the Carina Near Moving Group. Two flares were reported from this star in 1969 by N. I. Shakhovskaya, confirming it as a flare star. It was identified as an astrometric binary in 1994 by W. D. Heintz, who found a period of 14.5 years. The pair were resolved using adaptive optics in 1999. Early mass estimates placed the companion near the substellar limit, and it was initially proposed as a brown dwarf but is now considered late-type red dwarf.

The primary member, component A, is an M-type main-sequence star with a stellar classification of M0.5. It is young, magnetically very active star with a high rate of rotation and strong Hα emission. The star experiences star spots that cover 10–15% of the surface It is smaller and less massive than the Sun. The star is radiating just 4.4% of the luminosity of the Sun from its photosphere at an effective temperature of 3,484 K.

A distant sub-stellar companion to the binary star system was discovered in 2010 as part of a deep infrared sky survey. The object varies slightly in brightness, which may be due to patchy clouds.

See also
 CM Draconis
 GU Piscium b
 HD 106906 b
 Kepler-16
 Lists of exoplanets
 NN Serpentis
 QS Virginis
 WD 0806-661

References

External links
 Simbad

M-type main-sequence stars
Flare stars
Binary stars
Planetary systems with one confirmed planet

Virgo (constellation)
0494
063510
Virginis, DT